The HESA Shahed 136 (literally "Witness-136"), or Geran-2 (literally "Geranium-2") in Russian service, is an Iranian loitering munition in the form of an autonomous pusher-prop drone. It is designed and manufactured by Shahed Aviation Industries.

The munition is designed to attack ground targets from a distance, fired in multiples from a launch rack (in batches of five upwards) to overwhelm air defenses by consuming their resources during the attack. The first public footage of the drone were released in December 2021.

Overview

Description 
The aircraft has a cropped delta-wing shape, with a central fuselage blending into the wings and stabilizing rudders at the tips. The nose section contains a warhead estimated to weigh . The engine sits in the rear of the fuselage and drives a two-bladed propeller in a "pusher" arrangement. The U.S. Army unclassified worldwide equipment guide states that the Shahed 136 design could support an aerial reconnaissance option although no cameras were noted in the Geran-2 drone.

Deployment 
Because of the portability of the launch frame and drone assembly, the entire unit can be mounted on the back of any military or commercial truck.

The aircraft is launched at a slight upward angle and is assisted in initial flight by rocket launch assistance (RATO). The rocket is jettisoned immediately after launch, whereupon the drone's conventional Iranian-made Mado MD-550 four-cylinder piston engine (possibly a reverse-engineered German Limbach L550E, also used in other Iranian drones such as the Ababil-3) takes over.

Electronics 
Despite no markings, experts believe the munition uses a computer processor manufactured by the American company Altera, RF modules by Analog Devices and LDO chips by Microchip Technology.

Inspection of captured drones used by Russia during 2022 year Ukraine invasion revealed that the Shahed-136 electronics were manufactured from American- and EU-made components, such as a Texas Instruments TMS320 processor and a Polish made fuel pump on behalf of UK-based company TI Fluid Systems.

Confusion with Shahed 131
It is visually similar to the smaller Shahed 131, differing mainly by its wingtip stabilisers extending up and down rather than only up on the Shahed 131. The Shahed 131 has a simple inertial navigation system (INS) and a GPS with some electronic warfare protection, which the Shahed 136 may also have.

Geran-2

Geran-2 is the name of the munition in Russian service. The Washington Post reported an expert on Russian military systems at the CNA Strategy, Policy, Plans and Programs Center suggesting that the Geran-2 may use additional steering methods compared to the standard Iranian Shahed 136. A The Times of Israel correspondent notes that the Iranian navigation system made from civilian components has been replaced with a Russian manufactured flight control unit and microprocessors, using the Russian GLONASS GNSS system rather than U.S. civilian grade GPS, seemingly improving its loitering munition capability. Geran-2 has labeling and paint color matching Russian rather than Iranian munitions. No cameras or short-range sensors were noted.

On 19 November 2022, The Washington Post reported that U.S. intelligence agencies were briefing that Russia and Iran had agreed to the Russian manufacture of the munition, with Iran exporting key components.

Various colloquial terms have been used for these munitions such as "mopeds" or "lawnmowers", alluding to the loud sound of their engine in flight, and "doritos" in reference to their delta-winged silhouette.

Combat history

2014 Yemeni Civil War 
The drone has reportedly been used by the Houthis in the Yemeni Civil War during 2020. There were some reports of its use in the 2019 attack of Saudi oil plants at Abqaiq and Khurais, however The Washington Post reported that other types of drone were used in that attack.

2022 Russian war in Ukraine 

During the 2022 war in Ukraine, Russia has used loitering munitions bearing the name Geran-2 (literally "Geranium-2") against Ukraine. These Geran-2 drones are considered by Ukraine and its Western allies to be redesignated Iranian-made Shahed-136 drones.

In the months prior to the confirmation of their use, US intelligence sources and Ukrainian officials have claimed that Iran had supplied Russia with several hundred drones including Shahed-136s, although Iran has repeatedly rejected the claims that it had sent drones for use in Ukraine, saying it is neutral in the war. . However, on 2 September 2022 the Commander of the IRGC General Hossein Salami said at a Tehran arms show that "some major world powers" had purchased Iranian military equipment and his men were "training them to employ the gear". Russia stated it uses unmanned aerial vehicles (UAVs) of domestic manufacture. This may reflect domestic production of these drones within Russia.

On 21 November 2022, a British government minister stated that the number of Shahed-136 loitering munitions used in Ukraine was estimated to be in the low hundreds.

First appearances 

On 13 September 2022, initial use of the Shahed 136 was indicated by photos of the remains of a drone inscribed with -2, operated by Russian forces. According to Rodion Kulahin, the Ukrainian artillery commander of the 92nd Brigade, Shahed 136 drones destroyed four howitzers and two BTRs during the Kharkiv counter-offensive. On 23 September, further use of the drones was recorded in Odesa, where videos of their flyover and subsequent impact were uploaded on various Telegram channels. Notably, the drones were audibly engaged with small arms fire, which did not seem to have shot down any of the aircraft. On 25 September, videos posted on social media shows intensified use of the drone by the Russian forces around Odesa and Dnipro cities. This time, along with small arms, some form of anti-aircraft rotary cannon was employed, along with surface-to-air missiles, downing at least one Geran-2. A number of the drones were able to hit unknown targets, although there are claims the Ukrainian Navy Headquarters in Odessa was hit.

On 5 October 2022, a Geran-2 struck barracks hosting soldiers from the 72nd Mechanized Brigade in Bila Tserkva.

Ukrainian soldiers claim they can be heard from several kilometers away and are vulnerable to small arms fire.

Ukrainian sources stated they deployed MiG-29 fighter aircraft to shoot down these drones with success, claiming that they used a similar strategy to shoot down cruise missiles such as the Kalibr. However, on 13 October 2022, a Ukrainian MiG-29 crashed in Vinnytsia while attempting to shoot down a Geran-2. According to Ukrainian sources, one version of the incident is that the drone detonated near the jet and shrapnel struck the cockpit which forced the pilot to eject.

October waves 
Geran-2 drones participated in the October missile strikes that disabled large sections of the Ukrainian power grid. Ukraine's military said it shot down the first Shahed 136 on September 13, and that 46 of the drones were launched on October 6, 24 on October 10, and 47 on October 17.

In the morning of 17 October Kyiv was attacked again. The drones were engaged by small-caliber ground fire as well as dedicated air-defense systems, but the drones reportedly hit several locations, including the offices of Ukrenergo. Other energy infrastructure facilities were also reported to be attacked, leading to blackouts around the affected infrastructure. Ukrainian Prime Minister Denys Shmyhal said the strikes hit critical energy infrastructure in three regions, knocking out electricity to hundreds of towns and villages. At least 8 people were killed during the day's attack.

The cost-benefit analysis of using these drones in strikes versus the defending air defense systems is in favor of the Shahed drones, being about half the cost of the defenses employed against them, such as emplaced SAM systems. Loitering munitions downed after they have reached cities can lead to large-scale collateral damage from falling wreckage. The average Shahed drone is worth about $20,000. An IRIS-T missile is worth about $430,000 in comparison. From 13 September until 17 October, it has been estimated that Ukraine has spent $28.14 million on defences against these drones.

The US Department of Defense has stated that a number of Iranian experts were deployed to Crimea to provide technical support for the drones used in the attacks.

Ukrainian sources claim that more than 220 of these drones were shot down since 13 September.

In December use of the munitions resumed after a three-week pause. Ukraine suggested the suspension was to modify them for cold weather, but the British Ministry of Defence stated it was likely due to the exhaustion of previous stock followed by a resupply. On 14 December, a Shahed-136 drone that exploded in Kyiv had “For Ryazan“ written on in Russian, a reference to attacks on the Dyagilevo air base in Ryazan.

Ukrainian counter efforts 

The drones are too slow, fly too low and are too small to be detected by MiG-29 radar. One Ukrainian pilot described the drone’s radar picture as similar to a truck on a road. Ukrainian R-73 missiles don’t work in cloud cover.  Thus, Ukrainian aircraft can only intercept these drones using their 30mm cannon.   Even with guns, the risk of damage to their own aircraft limits such approaches. 

Night interceptions are even harder as pilots have to rely on GPS to know whether they are over a population centre, lest a crashing drone cause collateral damage to civilian areas.  In most cases all the pilots can do is contact ground based air defences to intercept these drones. 

Ukraine’s Air Force also believe that the drones are used to test the effectiveness of defences prior to missile attacks, to probe for weaknesses.  The Ukrainian pilot called “Karaya” was credited with downing 5 Shahed drones in a week.  However the explosion of the final drone downed his own MiG-29. Ukraine claims an interception rate of “65% and 85%”.

A Ukrainian defense attaché in the United States stated that SA-8 missiles and both the Soviet-era ZSU-23-4 and the German-supplied Flakpanzer Gepard SPAAGs have been used to "great effect" against these "relatively crude" drones.

In early November 2022, Forbes reported on Ukrainian efforts to seek "Shahed catchers." Because legacy anti-aircraft weapons are less suited to intercepting swarms of cheap drones, various dedicated counter-UAS systems are being acquired. There are also domestic Ukraine options such as the Fowler. All systems are similar in that they use a large number of small interceptors to be able to counter drones launched en-masse simultaneously approaching from different directions.

DShK machine guns fitted with thermal imaging or cameras are among the most cost effective weapons for shooting down these drones. Some are working with searchlights like during World War 2.

Reactions 
In response to the initial attacks, Ukrainian President Volodymyr Zelenskyy has denounced it as "a collaboration with evil". Diplomatic ties between Iran and Ukraine were subsequently reduced as a consequence of the attacks.

On 18 October 2022 the U.S. State Department accused Iran of violating United Nations Security Council Resolution 2231 by selling drones to Russia, agreeing with similar assessments by France and the United Kingdom. On 22 October France, Britain and Germany formally called for an investigation by the UN team responsible for UNSCR 2231. Iran's ambassador to the UN responded that these accusations were an erroneous interpretation of paragraph 4 of annex B of the resolution, which clearly states it applies to items that "could contribute to the development of nuclear weapon delivery systems", which these drones could not. Resolution 2231 was adopted after the Joint Comprehensive Plan of Action (JCPOA) was signed. The U.S. withdrew from the agreement under the Donald Trump administration in 2018. The embargo on conventional Iranian arms ended in October 2020, but the restrictions on Iran regarding missiles and related technologies are in place until October 2023.

An Iranian Major-General said 22 countries requested to purchase Iranian drones.

Multiple critics including a senior researcher of the Center for Security Studies called the weapon tactically useless, and said  that its role is as a weapon of terror against civilians. Others said it can be used to carried out devastating strikes to Ukrainian forces but are unlikely to be a game-changer for the war.

In response to the allegations of the use of Iranian drones, Iran affirmed its willingness to hold direct talks with and on 24 October 2022. Iran denied sending arms for use in the Ukraine war and Iranian foreign minister Hossein Amir-Abdollahian said Iran will not remain indifferent if it is proven that Russia used Iranian drones in the war against Ukraine. On 5 November 2022, Abdollahian said Iran shipped "a small number" of drones to Russia before the war. He repeated Iran will not remain indifferent if proven Russia used Iranian drones against Ukraine. He denounced Ukraine for not showing up at talks to discuss evidences of Russian use of Iranian drones. Iran foreign ministry continued to refute sending weapons for use in the war.

2022 Syria 
The U.S. military believes groups allied to Iran used the Shahed 136 in August 2022 against a U.S.-run military base at Al-Tanf in Syrian opposition controlled territory in the Syrian Desert.

2022 Iraqi Kurdistan 

In 2022, the IRGC Ground Forces used the Shahed 136 drone in attacks on headquarters of Kurdish separatist group in the Kurdistan region of Iraq.

Operators 

 
 (alleged)

See also

References

External links 
 
 Animated Video: . Retrieved 27 October 2022.

Shahed 136
149
Military equipment of Iran
Unmanned aerial vehicles of Iran
Unmanned military aircraft of Iran
Aircraft manufactured in Iran
Iranian military aircraft
Single-engined pusher aircraft
High-wing aircraft
V-tail aircraft
Military equipment of the 2022 Russian invasion of Ukraine
Loitering munition